Kalabaria Union is an Union Parishad under Lohagara Upazila of Narail District in the division of Khulna, Bangladesh. It has an area of 64.33 km2 (24.84 sq mi) and a population of 31,747.

References

Unions of Kalia Upazila
Unions of Narail District
Unions of Khulna Division